Forest–Norman Historic District is a national historic district in Ridgewood, Queens, New York.  It includes 37 contributing buildings built between 1908 and 1910.  They consist of two-story brick houses with one apartment per floor and two-story brick tenements with two apartments per floor.

It was listed on the National Register of Historic Places in 1983.

References

Ridgewood, Queens
Historic districts on the National Register of Historic Places in Queens, New York
Historic districts in Queens, New York